A jumping platform is a naturally occurring or human-made surface for people to jump from.  It is usually situated above a body of water, or above mats, a box-spring mattress, piles of empty cardboard boxes, or other soft landing surfaces, or they may be used together with other means of dampening the impact (such as for example, platforms for bungee jumping). Jumping platforms may often be improvised, for example a platform at an abandoned quarry or by moving a desk next to a bed.

Platforms for jumping into water from height

For jumping into water from height, a platform is usually a simple clearing in the bushes and other vegetation along the cliff above a river, ocean, lake, or quarry.

Sometimes railway bridges and other bridges are used as platforms. They can sometimes be distances up to approximately 30 metres (100 feet) above the water.

Abandoned quarries, and deep ponds will often have platforms, whether by design, or by improvisation from people in the local area.  For example, platforms will often be affixed to towers in abandoned rail yards, overlooking a deep pond.
Many naturally occurring platforms are unofficial and there location may be known by people within the local area.

People may be trespassing when using jumping platforms with one example being jumping platforms on quarry land.

Hazards 

When jumping into water from height a bad angle of entry can cause injury when impacting with the water surface. This may include broken bones or re-arrangement of internal organs. Being knocked unconscious by the impact can also lead to drowning.

Also when jumping into water there may be submerged objects or a floating object may be near the surface of the water such as a dead fish, beverage can, bottle or branches.

It was also reported that "If you jump from 20 feet (6 meters) above the water, you'll hit the water at 25 mph (40 kmh) -- the impact is strong enough to compress your spine, break bones or give you a concussion."

Jumping from height into water technique

For jumping into water from height it was reported that "In a pencil dive, you strive to make your body as slim and straight as a pencil. Jump feet first with your arms held tightly to your sides and your feet pressed together and pointed downward. This minimizes the surface area that strikes the water, reducing the force of impact... You need to enter the water in a straight, vertical line..."

For larger jumps ( +), the angle of entry is critical. To ensure that you always enter the water vertically, it is proper to jump leaning slightly forward, keeping your point of entry in view. Extend your arms for balance. As you fall, gradually tuck in your arms, and bring together your legs. A gradual backward rotation throughout the jump will bring you from your initial forward position to complete a vertical entry. Common errors include backward over rotation and not tucking in arms or legs. Keep legs straight with a slight bend at the knees. Locking your legs when taking the pencil shape will cause impact on the knees. 

It has been reported in relation to jumping from height into water to "Start low and slow... practice the pencil dive from high-dive platforms at a swimming pool."

A closed mouth also assist in a smooth jump and some prefer to jump with shoes or sandals, while others jump merely barefoot or naked.

See also 

 Coasteering
 Seatrekking
 Tombstoning

References

Diving (sport)
Bungee jumping